Euetheola is a genus of rhinoceros beetles in the family Scarabaeidae. There are about seven described species in Euetheola.

Species
These seven species belong to the genus Euetheola:
 Euetheola bidentata (Burmeister, 1847)
 Euetheola hippocrepis Prokofiev, 2012
 Euetheola humilis (Burmeister, 1847) (sugarcane beetle)
 Euetheola latipennis Arrow, 1911
 Euetheola paraguayensis Prokofiev, 2014
 Euetheola sibericana Prokofiev, 2012
 Euetheola subglabra (Schaeffer, 1909)

References

Further reading

 
 
 
 

Dynastinae
Articles created by Qbugbot